Peter S. Ungar (born May 4, 1963) is an American paleoanthropologist and evolutionary biologist.

Life
Peter S. Ungar is Distinguished Professor and Director of the Environmental Dynamics Program at the University of Arkansas.  Before arriving at Arkansas, he taught at the Johns Hopkins School of Medicine and the Duke University Medical Center.

Ungar is known primarily for his work on the role of diet in human evolution.  He has spent thousands of hours observing wild apes and other primates in the rainforests of Latin America and Southeast Asia, studied fossils from tyrannosaurids to Neandertals, documented oral health of the Hadza Hunter-Gatherers of Tanzania, and developed new techniques for using advanced surface analysis technologies to tease information about diet from tooth shape and patterns of use wear.

Ungar has written or coauthored more than 200 scientific works on ecology and evolution for books and journals including Nature,  Science,  Proceedings of the National Academy of Sciences, and Philosophical Transactions of the Royal Society.  These have focused on food choices and feeding in living primates, and the role of diet in the evolution of human ancestors and other fossil species.  His book Mammal Teeth: Origin, Evolution and Diversity won the PROSE Award for best book in the Biological Sciences, and he edited Evolution of the Human Diet: The Known, the Unknown and the Unknowable and coedited Human Diet: Its Origins and Evolution. His forays into popular science writing include  Teeth: A Very Short Introduction, and his most recent trade book, Evolution's Bite:  A Story about Teeth, Diet, and Human Origins.

Ungar's work has been featured in hundreds of electronic, print, and broadcast media outlets, and he appeared recently in documentaries on the Discovery Channel, BBC Television, and the Science Channel.

Selected publications 
 Peter S. Ungar, "The Trouble with Teeth: Our teeth are crowded, crooked and riddled with cavities. It hasn't always been this way", Scientific American, vol. 322, no. 4 (April 2020), pp. 44–49. "Our teeth [...] evolved over hundreds of millions of years to be incredibly strong and to align precisely for efficient chewing. [...] Our dental disorders largely stem from a shift in the oral environment caused by the introduction of softer, more sugary foods than the ones our ancestors typically ate."

Books
 Ungar, P.S. Evolution's Bite: A Story of Teeth, Diet, and Human Origins. 2017. 
 Ungar, P.S. Teeth: A Very Short Introduction. 2014. 
 Ungar, P.S. Mammal Teeth: Origin, Evolution, and Diversity. 2010.

References

External links
Tedx, The ancestral human diet
TedEd Lesson, How did teeth evolve?
Scientific American blog, The true human diet
Aeon blog, It’s not that your teeth are too big
Department of Anthropology, University of Arkansas
Environmental Dynamics Program, University of Arkansas
Diet reconstruction of the "Nutcracker Man"

American paleoanthropologists
Living people
1963 births
Binghamton University alumni